Truncilla truncata, the deertoe, is a species of freshwater mussel, an aquatic bivalve mollusk in the family Unionidae.

References

Unionidae